Mohamed Ben Ali (born 16 February 1995) is a Tunisian footballer who plays as a defender for Tunisian Ligue Professionnelle 1 club Espérance de Tunis.

Honours
CS Sfaxien
Tunisian Cup: 2018–19, 2020–21

References

1995 births
Stade Tunisien players
CS Sfaxien players
Espérance Sportive de Tunis players
Tunisian Ligue Professionnelle 1 players
Living people
Tunisian footballers
Association football defenders